Mary McCarthy may refer to:

The arts
 Mary Downing (1815–1881), Irish poet born Mary McCarthy
 Mary Stanislaus MacCarthy (1849–1897), Irish poet and nun
 Mary MacCarthy (1882–1953), English writer and member of the Bloomsbury Group
 Mary Eunice McCarthy (1899–1969), American screenwriter, playwright, and journalist
 Mary McCarthy (author) (1912–1989), American novelist, critic, and memoirist
 Mary McCarthy (screenwriter), American, screenwriter for movies Theodora Goes Wild (1936) and Sister Kenny (1946)
 Mary McCarthy (fiction writer) (1951–2013), Irish novelist, teacher, book reviewer

Other
 Mary McCarthy (activist) (1866–1933), New Zealand temperance advocate and teacher
 Mary McCarthy Gomez Cueto (1900–2009), wealthy Canadian expatriate who lived an impoverished life in Havana
 Mary McCarthy (police officer) (1903–1978), Australian police officer
 Mary McCarthy (CIA) (born 1945), former CIA employee accused of leaking information
 Mary Ann McCarthy, Irish orphan who fatally stabbed her husband